The Magnet is a 1950 British comedy film featuring Stephen Murray, Kay Walsh and in his first starring role James Fox (then billed as William Fox). The story involves a young Wallasey boy, Johnny Brent (Fox), who obtains the eponymous magnet by deception, leading to much confusion. When he is acclaimed as a hero, he is shamed by his own sense of guilt.

Plot
Eleven year old Johnny Brent (Fox) is home from school during a scarlet fever outbreak, but not making much attempt to stay isolated. He lives in New Brighton on the North West coast. After watching his father board the ferry to his work as a psychologist in Liverpool, he spends the rest of the morning playing on the beach.

He manages to con a younger boy out of a large horseshoe magnet by trading it for an "invisible watch". The other boy's nanny is not happy with the swap. Johnny is almost run over and sees it as karma and decides to get rid of the magnet. After an older boy uses the magnet to cheat at pinball and Johnny is implicated, Johnny continues to try to get rid of the magnet. He meets an eccentric iron lung maker who is raising funds for the local hospital, and gives him the magnet to be auctioned for charity. The iron lung maker, rather bizarrely demonstrating his equipment in the middle of a seaside beauty contest, tells the story of the magnet at various fund-raising events, exaggerating wildly and portraying Johnny as everything from a spoiled brat to a Dickensian ragamuffin. He auctions the magnet to the crowd and sells it for £40. No one wants it though and it keeps coming back allowing it to be repeatedly auctioned,

On a train returning to school, Johnny sees the little boy's nanny and overhears her telling her friend about her budgerigar, which she says has died of a broken heart. Johnny mistakenly thinks she is talking about the little boy himself, and becomes convinced that he has caused the death of the boy. Various other things he overhears confirms his theory. His mum realises something is wrong and tries to make him feel useful. She sends him to the local Maypole Dairy on an errand. He is again startled by a policeman and hides in the back of a Jacob's cream crackers van, which takes him to the Liverpool slums, where he comes into conflict with the local boys. He wins them over by convincing them he is a fugitive from the police. They hide him in a building on the disused pier. They leave him a tin of soup and some dry macaroni.

He saves the life of one boy who had fallen through a disused pier. The injured boy ends up in an iron lung made by the man to whom Johnny gave the magnet. When Johnny visits the boy, he sees the magnet mounted on the iron lung and is reunited with the inventor, who is delighted to have found Johnny again. Johnny is awarded the Civic Gold Medal. When he later re-encounters the original boy on the beach he swaps the medal for his old "invisible watch" and clears his conscience.

Cast 

Stephen Murray – Dr Brent
Kay Walsh – Mrs Brent
James Fox (billed as William Fox) – Johnny Brent
Meredith Edwards – Harper
Gladys Henson – Nanny
Thora Hird – Nanny's friend
Michael Brooke (as Michael Brooke Jr) – Kit
Wylie Watson – Pickering
Julien Mitchell – Mayor
Anthony Oliver – Policeman
 Thomas Johnston - Perce
 Geoffrey Yin - Choppo
Molly Hamley-Clifford – Mrs Dean
Harold Goodwin – Pin table man
Joan Hickson – Mrs Ward
Joss Ambler – Businessman
Sam Kydd – Postman
Russell Waters – Doctor
James Robertson Justice (as Seumas Mor na Fesag) – Tramp

Production and casting
The Magnet was filmed on location in and around New Brighton, Wallasey, the Wirral, Cheshire, Liverpool, Ealing and at Ealing Studios, London, in black and white. A collection of location stills and corresponding contemporary photographs is hosted at reelstreets.com.

Given its setting, however, authentic local accents are absent until almost the end of the film, in a scene filmed in the shadow of the Liverpool Cathedral. A Chinese boy (played by Geoffrey Yin) appears in this scene, which was unusual for the time in film, although there had been a significant Chinese community in Liverpool since the 1860s, but when he is called home by his mother in Chinese, explains this to his friends in a fluent Liverpool accent.

James Fox (then known as William) had appeared in The Miniver Story earlier in the year, and this was his first starring role, at the age of 11; his performance was largely appreciated, being described by the British Film Institute's reviewer as "certainly lively enough as the over-imaginative Johnny". Stalwarts of Ealing's repertory ensemble, however, such as Stanley Holloway and Alec Guinness, were absent, although James Robertson Justice made a small appearance as a tramp, using a Gaelic pseudonym; at the time he was a candidate in the General Election.

Reception
The film has not achieved the general popularity of better-known Ealing comedies such as Passport to Pimlico and The Lavender Hill Mob, although it is described as "a mild-mannered affair and the comedy gives way to a decidedly poignant conclusion". Leslie Halliwell similarly described it as a "very mild Ealing comedy, not really up to snuff". The British Film Institute's reviewer criticised it as "somewhat burdened by cumbersome moralising and too many credibility-stretching coincidences and misunderstandings" and described it as "an attempt to revisit the success of Clarke's earlier Hue and Cry".

The film was a box office disappointment.

References

External links
 

1950 films
1950 comedy films
British comedy films
Films directed by Charles Frend
Ealing Studios films
Films set in Liverpool
Films produced by Michael Balcon
Films scored by William Alwyn
British black-and-white films
1950s English-language films
1950s British films